Nebriosoma is a genus of ground beetles in the family Carabidae. This genus has a single species, Nebriosoma fallax. It is found in Australia.

References

Migadopinae